Didargah may refer to:
 Didargah-e Olya
 Didargah-e Sofla